The Quechuan mouse opossum (Marmosa macrotarsus) is a South American opossum species of the family Didelphidae. It is known from two areas of montane forest on the eastern slopes of the Andes in Peru, at altitudes from 300 to 2700 m. The type locality in the Valle de Occobamba is in the southern area, in Cuzco Region, while the northern area is in the vicinity of Moyobamba in San Martín Region. The true range may be more extensive and possibly extends into Bolivia. The northern area has suffered from habitat destruction, but the southern area is not seriously degraded.

References

Opossums
Endemic fauna of Peru
Opossum, Quechuan mouse
Opossum, Quechuan mouse
Opossum, Quechuan mouse
Mammals described in 1842
Taxobox binomials not recognized by IUCN